HMS Antrim was a  armoured cruiser built for the Royal Navy  in the first decade of the 20th century. She was assigned to the 1st Cruiser Squadron of the Channel Fleet upon completion in 1905  and was transferred to the 2nd Cruiser Squadron of the Atlantic Fleet in 1907. She was assigned to the reserve Third Fleet in 1909 and then became flagship of the 3rd Cruiser Squadron of the reserve Second Fleet in 1913.

Upon mobilisation in mid-1914 her squadron was assigned to the Grand Fleet and spent much of its time patrolling the northern exits from the North Sea. Antrim was sent to Arkhangelsk in mid-1916 and then to the North America and West Indies Station for convoy escort duties. She was paid off at the end of 1917, but was recommissioned in mid-1918 as a convoy escort. The ship was in reserve by 1919, but conducted radio and Asdic trials in 1920 before becoming a training ship in 1922. Antrim was sold for scrap at the end of the year.

Design and description
Antrim was designed to displace . The engines were powered by seventeen Yarrow and six cylindrical boilers.

Her main armament consisted of four breech-loading (BL) BL 7.5-inch Mk I guns mounted in four single-gun turrets, one each fore and aft of the superstructure and one on each side. Her secondary armament of six BL 6-inch Mk VII guns was arranged in casemates amidships. Four of these were mounted on the main deck and were only usable in calm weather. Antrim also carried 18 quick-firing (QF) 3-pounder Hotchkiss guns and two submerged 18-inch torpedo tubes. Her two 12-pounder 8 cwt guns  could be dismounted for service ashore.

At some point in the war, the main deck six-inch guns of the Devonshire-class ships were moved to the upper deck and given gun shields. Their casemates were plated over to improve seakeeping and the four 3-pounder guns displaced by the transfer were landed.

The armour of the gun turrets was also five inches thick whilst that of their barbettes was six inches thick.

Construction and service
Antrim, named to commemorate the Irish county, was laid down by John Brown & Company at their Clydeside shipyard on 27 August 1902 and launched on 8 October 1903. She was completed on 23 June 1905 and was initially assigned to the 1st Cruiser Squadron of the Channel Fleet together with most of her sister ships. She was sent to Casablanca, Morocco August 1907 following an insurrection that led to the bombardment of Casablanca. She was transferred to the 2nd Cruiser Squadron of the Atlantic Fleet in March 1907 and was then assigned to the reserve Third Fleet at Devonport in April 1909. She was moved to the Mersey during the 1911 Liverpool general transport strike. In December 1912 the ship became the flagship of the 3rd Cruiser Squadron of the Second Fleet.

The squadron was assigned to the Grand Fleet in mid-1914 as the Navy mobilised for war. It spent much of its time with the Grand Fleet reinforcing the patrols near the Shetland and Faeroe Islands and the Norwegian coast where Antrim captured a German merchantman on 6 August. Two months later, she was unsuccessfully attacked by the German submarine  on 9 October. Despite numerous sorties with the main body of the Grand Fleet, she did not see combat. The ship was sent to Archangelsk in June 1916 and was then transferred for convoy escort duties to the North America and West Indies Station. Antrim returned home in December 1917 and was paid off. She was recommissioned in August 1918 and resumed her former duties until the end of the war in November.

She was in reserve at the Nore in 1919, but was modified to conduct radio and Asdic trials. She recommissioned in March 1920 for the trials and became a cadet training ship in 1922. Antrim was sold for scrap on 19 December 1922 and was subsequently broken up at Blyth, Northumberland.

Notes

Footnotes

Bibliography

External links
 

 

Devonshire-class cruisers (1903)
Ships built on the River Clyde
1903 ships
World War I cruisers of the United Kingdom